South Ann Street–Mill Street Historic District is a national historic district located at Little Falls in Herkimer County, New York. The district includes 15 contributing buildings and one contributing structure.  They relate to the history of transportation and commercial/industrial development of the city.  They include multi-story brick and stone commercial buildings, the former New York Central Railroad passenger station, remains of Erie Canal trunk and aqueduct, and a former hydroelectric power station and remains of the related dam.

It was listed on the National Register of Historic Places in 2008.

References

Historic districts on the National Register of Historic Places in New York (state)
Historic districts in Herkimer County, New York
National Register of Historic Places in Herkimer County, New York